Christopher Lloyd Johnson (born 30 May 1976) is a former professional Australian rules footballer.

His career highlights as an Australian Football League (AFL) player include three premierships with Brisbane, All-Australian selection, captain of the Australian International Rules team and inclusion in the Indigenous Team of the Century.

Johnson was one of eight players to transfer to Brisbane when Fitzroy's AFL operations were taken over by the Brisbane Bears to form the Brisbane Lions and became the last Fitzroy Lion to play in the AFL.

After retiring from playing professionally, Johnson started coaching and played and coached Essendon District Football League team Avondale Heights Football Club between 2010 and 2012.

His son Lachlan Johnson was drafted to the Essendon Football Club in the 2019 rookie draft.

He now plays for his junior club, Jacana.

Early life
Johnson grew up in Jacana, a northern suburb of Melbourne.  He played for the Northern Under 18 side in the TAC Cup, including their 1993 Grand Final winning team, when he kicked 7 goals.

AFL career
Johnson began his professional AFL career with Fitzroy in 1994. He was awarded a nomination in the 1994 AFL Rising Star award in round 21.

He was one of eight players allowed to transfer to Brisbane when Fitzroy's AFL operations were taken over by the Brisbane Bears to form the Brisbane Lions. His career highlights include three premierships with Brisbane, All-Australian selection and inclusion in the Indigenous Team of the Century.

Johnson is renowned for his creative play and composure running out of defence. Nevertheless, his 2007 preseason saw him playing as regularly in the forward line and the midfield as a defender, signalling the club's intention to use him as an impact player.

Johnson was appointed co-captain of the Lions in 2007, alongside Simon Black, Luke Power, Jonathan Brown, and Nigel Lappin.

On 31 August 2007, Johnson announced that he would retire from football at the end of the season. He was the last former Fitzroy Lion still playing in the AFL.

International rules series 2005
In the 2005 International Rules series, Johnson was named co-captain along with Andrew McLeod. In the second game of the series, Johnson started a brawl by clothes line tackling (or "coat hanger") Philip Jordan and striking Mattie Forde. He was suspended for five matches after pleading guilty to striking, ruling him out until the second Test in 2008.

Coaching career
Following his AFL career, he remained involved in the game.

He became a runner for the Brisbane Lions, appearing in Round 11 against Fremantle Dockers. 

Then he shifted into coaching. On Friday 14 September 2007, Johnson signed on with the club as a full-time development coach for the Brisbane Lions.  His job is to continue to assist in the development of the club's young playing list in the new position and to show off field leadership.  He was promoted to assistant coach to Michael Voss.

He coached Brisbane school and AFL powerhouse St Peters Lutheran College for two years, posting a 10–0 record over his two-year tenure as the head coach for the opens team. They captured the 2007 and 2008 AIC AFL Premiership after defeating Iona College in the Grand Final on both occasions, before the competition was abandoned due to an increase of in game fights. In 2008, the school defeated Cairns school Djarragun College at the Gabba, before the Lions-Saints game, in an exhibition match to promote the AFL's indigenous round.

In February 2009, Johnson coached the Indigenous All-Stars to victory against Adelaide in Darwin.

In 2011 he was appointed the Australian Institute of Sport/AFL Level One Academy Coach.

Statistics

|-
|- style="background-color: #EAEAEA"
! scope="row" style="text-align:center" | 1994
|style="text-align:center;"|
| 2 || 17 || 23 || 19 || 132 || 71 || 203 || 49 || 34 || 1.4 || 1.1 || 7.8 || 4.2 || 11.9 || 2.9 || 2.0
|-
! scope="row" style="text-align:center" | 1995
|style="text-align:center;"|
| 2 || 20 || 25 || 18 || 142 || 79 || 221 || 57 || 42 || 1.3 || 0.9 || 7.1 || 4.0 || 11.1 || 2.9 || 2.1
|- style="background-color: #EAEAEA"
! scope="row" style="text-align:center" | 1996
|style="text-align:center;"|
| 2 || 22 || 19 || 15 || 213 || 176 || 389 || 76 || 85 || 0.9 || 0.7 || 9.7 || 8.0 || 17.7 || 3.5 || 3.9
|-
! scope="row" style="text-align:center" | 1997
|style="text-align:center;"|
| 2 || 19 || 11 || 12 || 160 || 65 || 225 || 56 || 33 || 0.6 || 0.6 || 8.4 || 3.4 || 11.8 || 2.9 || 1.7
|- style="background-color: #EAEAEA"
! scope="row" style="text-align:center" | 1998
|style="text-align:center;"|
| 2 || 14 || 20 || 14 || 87 || 46 || 133 || 42 || 16 || 1.4 || 1.0 || 6.2 || 3.3 || 9.5 || 3.0 || 1.1
|-
! scope="row" style="text-align:center" | 1999
|style="text-align:center;"|
| 2 || 20 || 25 || 14 || 121 || 52 || 173 || 55 || 24 || 1.3 || 0.7 || 6.1 || 2.6 || 8.7 || 2.8 || 1.2
|- style="background-color: #EAEAEA"
! scope="row" style="text-align:center" | 2000
|style="text-align:center;"|
| 2 || 21 || 6 || 4 || 159 || 121 || 280 || 84 || 24 || 0.3 || 0.2 || 7.6 || 5.8 || 13.3 || 4.0 || 1.1
|-
! scope="row" style="text-align:center" | 2001
|style="text-align:center;"|
| 2 || 21 || 4 || 9 || 234 || 137 || 371 || 105 || 34 || 0.2 || 0.4 || 11.1 || 6.5 || 17.7 || 5.0 || 1.6
|- style="background-color: #EAEAEA"
! scope="row" style="text-align:center" | 2002
|style="text-align:center;"|
| 2 || 22 || 7 || 3 || 203 || 114 || 317 || 103 || 47 || 0.3 || 0.1 || 9.2 || 5.2 || 14.4 || 4.7 || 2.1
|-
! scope="row" style="text-align:center" | 2003
|style="text-align:center;"|
| 2 || 21 || 9 || 2 || 185 || 126 || 311 || 91 || 44 || 0.4 || 0.1 || 8.8 || 6.0 || 14.8 || 4.3 || 2.1
|- style="background-color: #EAEAEA"
! scope="row" style="text-align:center" | 2004
|style="text-align:center;"|
| 2 || 25 || 3 || 4 || 221 || 164 || 385 || 117 || 51 || 0.1 || 0.2 || 8.8 || 6.6 || 15.4 || 4.7 || 2.0
|-
! scope="row" style="text-align:center" | 2005
|style="text-align:center;"|
| 2 || 22 || 6 || 5 || 243 || 123 || 366 || 122 || 48 || 0.3 || 0.2 || 11.0 || 5.6 || 16.6 || 5.5 || 2.2
|- style="background-color: #EAEAEA"
! scope="row" style="text-align:center" | 2006
|style="text-align:center;"|
| 2 || 8 || 3 || 1 || 77 || 38 || 115 || 34 || 19 || 0.4 || 0.1 || 9.6 || 4.8 || 14.4 || 4.3 || 2.4
|-
! scope="row" style="text-align:center" | 2007
|style="text-align:center;"|
| 2 || 12 || 11 || 6 || 91 || 47 || 138 || 62 || 25 || 0.9 || 0.5 || 7.6 || 3.9 || 11.5 || 5.2 || 2.1
|- class="sortbottom"
! colspan=3| Career
! 264
! 172
! 126
! 2268
! 1359
! 3627
! 1053
! 526
! 0.7
! 0.5
! 8.6
! 5.1
! 13.7
! 4.0
! 2.0
|}

References

External links

Australian rules footballers from Melbourne
1976 births
Living people
Brisbane Lions players
Brisbane Lions Premiership players
Brisbane Lions captains
Fitzroy Football Club players
All-Australians (AFL)
Indigenous Australian players of Australian rules football
Northern Knights players
Jacana Football Club players
Australia international rules football team players
Three-time VFL/AFL Premiership players
People from the City of Hume